Jorge Pereira Jardim (13 November 1919 in Lisbon – 1 December 1982) was a Portuguese agronomist and an entrepreneur in Mozambique, who was Secretary of State in the government of António de Oliveira Salazar.

He was a personal friend of Ian Smith, Prime Minister of Rhodesia, and of President Hastings Kamuzu Banda of Malawi, who appointed Jardim as Malawi’s Honorary Consul in Mozambique. During Marcelo Caetano's government, he tried to solve the problem of Mozambique through diplomatic negotiations, presenting his "Plan of Lusaka", which was replaced after the Carnation Revolution by the Lusaka Accord, that led to the independence of Mozambique.

Publications
 Jorge Jardim: Sanctions double-cross. Oil to Rhodesia. Bulawayo, Books of Rhodesia, 1979. 
 Jorge Jardim: Rodésia, o escândalo das sanções. Lisboa, Intervenção, 1978. 
 Jorge Jardim: Moçambique : terra queimada. Lisboa, Intervenção, 1976.

1919 births
1982 deaths
Portuguese politicians
20th-century Portuguese businesspeople
Businesspeople  from Lisbon